The Racecourse Ground is a football stadium in Wrexham, Wales.

It may also refer to these stadia in England:
County Cricket Ground, Derby, East Midlands 
Racecourse Ground, Hereford, West Midlands
The Racecourse, Durham University, North East England 
Racecourse Ground, Swaffham, Norfolk, East Anglia